Sorel Johannah Carradine (born June 18, 1985) is an American actress. Her parents are Keith Carradine and Sandra Will.

Carradine received her B.F.A. from USC School of Dramatic Arts, and began her career in 2005 with an appearance on the TV show Complete Savages. She has since appeared in series like Marvel's Runaways, Saving Grace and Southland, and films such as The Good Doctor and Nesting.

She is married to director Paul Kowalski.

Filmography

Film

Television

See also
Carradine family

References

External links
 

1985 births
21st-century American actresses
American film actresses
American television actresses
Living people
Actresses from Los Angeles
Carradine family
American people of Danish descent